This is a list of places in the principal area of Wrexham County Borough, Wales.

 

A
Aberoer
Acrefair
Acton
Acton Park
Arowry

B
Bangor-on-Dee
Bedwell
Bersham
Bettisfield
Black Park
Borras
Borras Park
Bradley
Bronington
Broughton
Brymbo
Bryn Offa
Brynteg
Burton
Bwlchgwyn

C
Caego
Caia Park
Cadney Bank
Cefn Mawr
Chirk
Cock Bank
Coedpoeth
Crabtree Green
Cross Lanes
Cumber's Bank

D
Darland
Ddôl
Drury Lane

E
Eglwys Cross, Tybroughton
Erddig
Erbistock

F
Fenns Bank
Froncysyllte

G
Gresford
Garden Village
Garth
Garth Trefor
Glyn Ceiriog
Gwersyllt
Gwynfryn

H
Halghton
Halton
Hanmer
Hightown
Holt
Horseman's Green

J
Johnstown

L
Lavister
Lightwood Green
Little Arowry
Llansantffraid Glyn Ceiriog; see Glyn Ceiriog
Llay

M
Marchwiel
Marford
Merehead
Minera
Moss Valley
Mount Sion

N
Newbridge
New Brighton

O
Overton-on-Dee

P
Parkey
Pandy (Ceiriog)
Pandy (Gwersyllt)
Pant
Penley
Pen-rhos
Pentre Broughton
Pentre Bychan
Pentre Maelor
Pentre (Chirk)
Pen-y-cae
Plas Coch
Plas Madoc
Ponciau
Pontfadog

Q
Queen's Park, and Queensway, see Caia Park

R
Redbrook
Ridleywood
Rhosddu
Rhosllanerchrugog
Rhosnesni
Rhosrobin
Rhostyllen
Rhosymadoc
Rhosymedre
Rossett
Ruabon

S
Singret
Southsea
Stansty
Strytlydan
Stryt-yr-hwch
Summerhill
Sydallt

T
Talwrn
Tanyfron
Tregeiriog
Trevor

W
Whitewell
Worthenbury
Wrexham
Wrexham Industrial Estate
Wrexham City Centre

See also
List of places in Wales

Wrexham